Green Lake Airport  is a public use airport located three nautical miles (6 km) south of the central business district of Interlochen, a community in Green Lake Township, Grand Traverse County, Michigan, United States. The airport is owned by Green Lake Township.

The airport is open to the public from April to October, but it closes from November to March.

Facilities and aircraft 
Green Lake Airport has two runways with turf surfaces: runway 5/23 is 2,800 by 170 feet (853 x 52 m), and runway 16/34 is 1,700 by 170 feet (518 x 52 m). Use of runway 16/34 is prohibited when the athletic fields at the end of the airport are in use.

The airport does not have a fixed-base operator, and no fuel is available. However, aircraft parking is available.

For the 12-month period ending December 31, 2021, the airport had 400 general aviation aircraft operations, an average of 33 per month. For the same time period, 4 aircraft are based at the airport: 2 single-engine airplanes and 2 ultralights.

References

External links 
  at the Michigan Airport Directory
 Aerial image as of April 1999 from USGS The National Map
 Green Lake Township Airport Page.

Airports in Michigan
Transportation in Grand Traverse County, Michigan